Benjamin Woods (1787–1867) was a New Zealand soldier, police officer and bailiff. He was born in King's County, Ireland in about 1787.

References

People from County Offaly
1787 births
1867 deaths
New Zealand military personnel
New Zealand police officers
Irish emigrants to New Zealand (before 1923)